The ninth season of the Australian competitive cooking competition show My Kitchen Rules premiered on the Seven Network on Monday 29 January 2018.

Applications for contestants opened during the airing of the eighth season. Pete Evans and Manu Feildel returned as judges, with Colin Fassnidge acting as a judge/mentor in the challenge/elimination rounds.

Format changes
Group Challenges – Teams were divided into two groups of eight for their Instant restaurant rounds. In previous series, teams were usually combined afterwards, however this year, teams continue to compete as part of their groups during the Top 14 to Top 9 rounds. Each group competed in separate People's Choice challenges which also allowed the opposing group to judge and observe the teams' cooking. Once the competition reached the Top 8, teams were combined as a single group.
Elimination House – After each challenge, the bottom two teams are sent to Elimination House, a large mansion with two full-sized kitchens for the competing teams to use. Both teams cook a three-course menu for a table of the remaining teams and judges Pete and Manu. Similar to an Instant Restaurant, guest teams and judges score both menus and the lower scoring team is eliminated from the competition.
Double Elimination Quarterfinal - For the first time, two teams will be eliminated from the competition in the last quarterfinal.

Teams

Elimination history

 Note:
 - Sonya & Hadil were initially “excused from the table” in Episode 38 at Kim & Suong's Ultimate Instant Restaurant from the competition due to issues from incidents. At Stella & Jazzey's Ultimate Instant Restaurant it was announced they would no longer participate and therefore they did not compete in this round as their scores were removed from the first three Ultimate Instant Restaurants (during their participation, they had scored Jess & Emma and Henry & Anna; and the average guest score was initially added for Kim & Suong). This round was closed off by Olga & Valeria and the lowest scoring team (Jess & Emma) from the remaining seven teams was still eliminated.

Competition details

Instant Restaurants
During the Instant Restaurant rounds, each team hosts a three-course dinner for judges and fellow teams in their allocated group. They are scored and ranked among their group, with the two lowest scoring teams competing in a Sudden Death Cook-Off at the Elimination House, where one team will be eliminated.

Round 1
 Episodes 1 to 8
 Air date — 29 January to 11 February
 Description — The first of the two instant restaurant groups are introduced into the competition in Round 1. The two lowest scoring teams at the end of this round will compete against each other in a Sudden Death Cook-Off at Elimination House, where one team will be eliminated.

Elimination House (Group 1)
 Episode 9
 Airdate — 12 February
 Description — Being the two bottom scoring teams from Round 1, Stella & Jazzey and Ash & Matty will face off in a Sudden Death Cook-Off. The lower scoring team is eliminated. As part of a format change, the Sudden Death Cook-Off is held in the Elimination House with eight new Group 2 teams invited as the guests and jury. Colin Fassnidge also returned as a mentor for the competing teams, and also act as timekeeper.

Round 2
 Episodes 10 to 17
 Airdate — 13 February to 22 February
 Description — The second group now start their Instant Restaurant round. The same rules from the previous round apply and the two lowest scoring teams compete against each other in a Sudden Death Cook-Off at the Elimination House, where one team will be eliminated.

Elimination House (Group 2)
 Episode 18
 Airdate — 26 February
 Description — Being the two bottom scoring teams from Round 2, Matt & Aly and Pat & Louisa will face off against each other in a Sudden Death Cook-Off. The lower scoring team is eliminated. Competing teams will go to the Elimination House where the seven remaining Group 1 teams are invited as the guests and jury.

Top 14

Elimination Challenge
 Episode 19
 Airdate — 27 February
 Description — All teams headed into the first challenge in a Group 1 vs Group 2 cook-off. In the first round, both groups nominated one team to cook an Aussie BBQ dish. The winning team saved their entire group from elimination. The losing team and their group then faced off individually in a Sudden Death Cook-Off, tasked to create a cultural dish. The team with the worst dish judged by Pete and Manu was eliminated.

Top 13

Group 1: High Tea Challenge 
 Episode 20
 Airdate — 28 February
 Description — Teams from Group 1 cooked and served at a High Tea party. Guests and teams from Group 2 were invited to taste the food and voted for their favourite dish. The team with the most votes won People's Choice and will earn an advantage at the elimination cook-off. Judges Pete and Colin sent the weakest team into Elimination House.

Group 2: Medieval Banquet Challenge 
 Episode 21
 Airdate — 1 March
 Description — Group 2 teams were challenged cook a feast for guests at a Medieval themed event. To fit with the theme, teams cooked with coal stoves and no electrical items were allowed. People's Choice was awarded to the team with the most votes from the guests and Group 1. Pete and Colin sent the weakest team to Elimination House to face Roula and Rachael in Sudden Death.

Elimination House (Group Challenge 1)
 Episode 22
 Airdate — 5 March
 Description — Roula & Rachael and Dan & Gemma were the weakest teams in the group challenges, will face off in a Sudden Death Cook-Off at Elimination House, where one team is eliminated. All guest teams score both meals out of 10. Alex & Emily and Davide & Marco, as People's Choice winners, had the advantage of having each team member score both meals, meaning their scores would be doubled. Judges Pete and Manu scored each dish out of 10.

Top 12

Group 2: Home Delivery Challenge 
 Episode 23
 Airdate — 6 March
 Description — Group 2 teams ran a home delivery service cooking at a Foodbank depot and then delivering their meals to local customers. Each team prepared two mains and side dishes. Dining customers and Group 1 teams scored the meals out of 10, with the highest scoring team earning People's Choice. Pete and Colin sent the weakest team to the next Elimination House cook-off.

Group 1: Lawn Bowls BBQ Challenge
 Episode 24
 Airdate — 7 March
 Description — Group 1 cooked at a lawn bowls club for a BBQ challenge, serving food to the public and Group 2 for votes. The team with the most votes won People's Choice. The judges then sent the weakest team to Elimination House to face Matt & Aly.

Elimination House (Group Challenge 2)
 Episode 25
 Airdate — 8 March
 Description — Matt & Aly and Josh & Nic, who were the weakest teams in the group challenges, will face off in a Sudden Death Cook-Off at Elimination House, where one team is eliminated. All guest teams score both meals out of 10. Dan & Gemma and Alex & Emily, as People's Choice winners, had the advantage of having each team member score both meals, meaning their scores would be doubled. Judges Pete and Manu scored each dish out of 10.

Top 11

Group 1: Kids Sports Day Challenge 
 Episode 26
 Airdate — 11 March
 Description — Group 1 teams hit the sports field where they were tasked with creating small, delicious and nutritious meals for 100 active kids using seasonal fresh produce. The kids and Group 2 were asked to vote for their favourite. The team with the most votes was named Kids' Choice. Pete, Colin & guest judge Curtis Stone sent the weakest team to the next Elimination House cook-off.

Group 2: Asian Street Food Challenge 
 Episode 27
 Airdate — 12 March
 Description — Group 2 is bringing the heat to Spice Alley, rocking the woks at their very own Asian street food stalls. Teams were asked to make Asian meals to please paying customers. Customer's Choice went to the team that made the most money. Pete and Colin sent the weakest team to the Elimination House Cook-Off.

Elimination House (Group Challenge 3)
 Episode 28
 Airdate — 13 March
 Description — Dan & Gemma and Alex & Emily, who were the weakest teams in the group challenges, will face off in a Sudden Death Cook-Off at Elimination House, where one team is eliminated. All guest teams score both meals out of 10. Stella & Jazzey and Davide & Marco, as People's Choice winners, had the advantage of having each team member score both meals, meaning their scores would be doubled. Judges Pete and Manu scored each dish out of 10.

Top 10

Group 2: Pool Party BBQ Challenge
 Episode 29
 Airdate — 14 March
 Description — At a Wet'n'Wild pool party, Group 2 were asked to fire up the BBQ and cook exciting, easy-to-eat food which “screamed summer” and would appeal to fun loving friends and families of all ages. The public and Group 1 were asked to vote for their favourite. Pete and Colin sent the weakest team to the Elimination House Cook-Off.

Group 1: Picnic Challenge
 Episode 30
 Airdate — 15 March
 Description — Group 1 were tasked with putting together incredible picnic baskets for around 200 people to enjoy in Centennial Park. The public and Group 2 were asked to vote for their favourite. Pete and Colin sent the weakest team to the Elimination House Cook-Off.

Elimination House (Group Challenge 4)
 Episode 31
 Airdate — 18 March
 Description — Georgie & Alicia and Alex & Emily, who were the weakest teams in the group challenges, will face off in a Sudden Death Cook-Off at Elimination House, where one team is eliminated. All guest teams score both meals out of 10. Henry & Anna and Josh & Nic, as People's Choice winners, had the advantage of having each team member score both meals, meaning their scores would be doubled. Judges Pete and Manu scored each dish out of 10.

Top 9

Group 1: Romantic Dinner Challenge
 Episode 32
 Airdate — 19 March
 Description — Group 1 create dishes for romantic dinner. Diners and Group 2 score the teams out of 10. One team was named Lover's Choice. Pete and Colin sent another team to the Elimination House Cook-Off.

Group 2: Shared Lunch Challenge
 Episode 33
 Airdate — 20 March
 Description — Group 2 had to create a menu of three savoury plates for a busy lunch service, with Manu serving as Head Chef again. The public and Group 1 score the teams out of 10. One team will be named People's Choice. Pete and Colin sent another team to the Elimination House Cook-Off.

Elimination House (Group Challenge 5)
 Episode 34
 Airdate — 21 March
 Description — Kim & Suong and Davide & Marco, who were the weakest teams in the group challenges, will face off in a Sudden Death Cook-Off at Elimination House, where one team is eliminated. All guest teams score both meals out of 10. Alex & Emily and Olga & Valeria, as People's Choice winners, had the advantage of having each team member score both meals, meaning their scores would be doubled. Judges Pete and Manu scored each dish out of 10.

Top 8 → Top 7

Supermarket Ice-cream Challenge

 Episode 35
 Air date — 15 April 
 Description — The two groups are now combined into one and teams must create an ice-cream worth packing for the grocery buying public. The team with the most votes wins People's Choice and will have their ice-cream produced, packaged and sold in Coles supermarkets across Australia. Pete and Colin will decide the bottom team who will receive a penalty in the next challenge.

Ultimate Instant Restaurants
 Episode 36 to 42
 Air date — 16 April to 25 April
 Description — The remaining eight teams headed around the country once again in an Ultimate Instant Restaurant round. All teams had to cook two dishes of each course (entrée, main and dessert) for their fellow contestants and judges for scoring. For the first time, teams are given strict time constraints to prepare and cook each course: 90 minutes for entrée and main and an hour for desserts. Guests have a choice of choosing one of the options per course, while the judges Pete and Manu each taste one of the two options.

 Colour Key:
  – Judge's Score for Option 1
  – Judge's Score for Option 2

 Note:
 – Sonya and Hadil were dismissed from the competition after episode 38. Following this dismissal, their guest scores were removed from the entire round and therefore the total score changed from 130 to 120. Initially they scored at the first two instant restaurants and an average score was calculated for Kim and Suong's.
 – As a penalty for creating the weakest dish at the ice-cream challenge, Stella and Jazzey had five minutes of cooking time removed for each course.
 – Suong fell ill and was taken away in an ambulance just before scoring, hence Kim scored on behalf of them both.
 – Individual guest scores were not revealed.

Top 6 - Quarter Finals
The Top 6 teams meet at Kitchen Headquarters to compete in four Quarter Final challenges to determine the teams entering the Semi-Final round. One team advances after each night until the Top 4 semi-finalists are decided and two teams will be eliminated.

Quarter Final 1

 Episode 43
 Air date — 26 April
 Description — The challenge for the first round was to "Master the Disaster" and replicate another teams dish and improve on it. Teams had up 75 minutes, but were deducted three minutes each based on where they finished in the Ultimate Instant Restaurants. The two winners faced-off in a second to determine who would be the first to the semi-finals. In the second round, the two winners had to repeat one of their own dishes.

Quarter Final 2

 Episode 44
 Air date — 29 April
 Description — The challenge for the first round was to prepare "cheap eats," the teams had 45 minutes to create a top dish that "feeds a family well at a price we can afford using value ingredients." The two best teams then faced-off in a second round where they were tasked to use high-end, luxury ingredients and had to complete in an hour. The winner earned the second spot into the semi-finals.

Quarter Final 3

 Episode 45
 Air date — 30 April
 Description — The challenge for the first round was to prepare a three course meal in two hours, using dairy products. The two best teams then faced-off in a second round where they cooked a dish of their choice. The winner earned the third spot into the semi-finals.

Quarter Final 4

 Episode 46
 Air date — 1 May
 Description — The three remaining teams were challenged to deliver a three course meal. The judges choose the types of courses they served: a soup for entrée in one hour, a roast for main in 90 minutes and a pastry for dessert in 30 minutes. For the first time in the My Kitchen Rules series, there was a double elimination.

 Note
 – The original roast duck was overcooked, hence a fried duck was used. This was against the brief.

Semi-finals

Semi-final 1
 Episode 47
 Airdate — 2 May
 Description — Josh & Nic being the first team to advance to the Semi Finals faced off against Kim & Suong the third team to advance to the Semi-Finals.

Semi-final 2
 Episode 48
 Airdate — 3 May 
 Description — Alex & Emily competed against Stella & Jazzey.

 Note:
 – Stella & Jazzey's dessert was originally Dulce De Leche Ice Cream with Popcorn, but was changed due to complications with the dish.

Grand Finale

 Episode 49
 Airdate — 6 May 
 Description — Each finalist cooked a five-course meal, with 20 plates per course for the eliminated teams, friends and family. The guest judges then scored their dishes for a final verdict.

Ratings
 Colour Key:
  – Highest rating in series
  – Lowest rating in series
  – Elimination episode
  – Finals week

Notes

References

2018 Australian television seasons
My Kitchen Rules